Humbaracı corps were bombardier and mortar troops of the Ottoman army.

It is considered as the first organized and specialized troops in the corps level for this class in the military history of the world.

Name 
Humbara (also pronounced kumbara) was derived from the Persian word hum-i pare (metal bowl or casing to store money). Due to the similarity of the shape of the projectiles, in Ottoman Turkish, it was used to name the bombshells cast from iron or bronze.

In modern Turkish, it also denotes the earthenware money box used by kids, basically a metal piggy bank.

History 
In the 16th century, Mustafa, an artillery officer in the Ottoman army established a workshop to cast humbaras in order to give the fire power of the artillery to the mobilized infantry groups.

On 1729, Claude Alexandre de Bonneval established a humbara school and reorganized all humbaracı soldiers in a corps-level military formation, founding the Humbaracı Corps.

On 1731, corps' size reached a little bit over of 600 soldiers, arranged in teams of 25, to serve as a detachment to armies.

On 1826, during the  Asakir-i Mansure-i Muhammediye movement to modernize the Ottoman Army, corps were dissolved.

Ammunition 
Humbaras could be cast by two ways:
Humbara-i dest:  thrown by hand
Humbara-i kebir: thrown with an apparatus

Garrison 
Humbaracı Kışlası or Kumbarahane ("Humbaracı Garrison") was located in the Hasköy district of the Istanbul, on the coast of Haliç. The street in front of the barracks are still called "Kumabarahane Street".

As considered one the first example of military garrisons, it included casting workshop, stable, training ground, kitchen, mosque, hospital, and shops. Garrison was also home , corresponds to sapper in modern armies.

On 1795, the garrison was expanded to include the Imperial School of Military Engineering.

References

External links
  (humbaracı)
  (humbara)

Military units and formations of the Ottoman Empire